Indobanalia is a monotypic genus of flowering plants belonging to the family Amaranthaceae. The only species is Indobanalia thyrsiflora.

Its native range is India.

References

Amaranthaceae
Amaranthaceae genera
Monotypic Caryophyllales genera